Logan Dennis Hutchings (born 28 January 1984) is a New Zealand former professional cyclist. He notably won the New Zealand National Time Trial Championships in 2008 and finished second overall in the 2005–06 UCI Oceania Tour.

Major results

2005
 Oceania Under-23 Road Championships
1st  Time trial
2nd Road race
 National Under-23 Road Championships
1st  Road race
1st  Time trial
2006
 2nd Overall UCI Oceania Tour
 6th Chrono Champenois
 7th Overall Tour of Wellington
2007
 3rd Overall Tour of Southland
2008
 National Road Championships
1st  Time trial
5th Road race
 1st Stages (TTT) Tour of Southland
 1st Stage 6 Tour de Namur
 10th Overall Tour de Bretagne
2009
 1st Stages 1 (TTT) & 3 Tour of Southland
 2nd Time trial, Oceania Road Championships
2010
 1st Overall Hotter'N Hell Hundred
1st Stage 3
2012
 2nd Bucks County Classic
2013
 1st Stage 3 Hotter'N Hell Hundred
2016
 9th The Reading 120

References

External links

1984 births
Living people
New Zealand male cyclists
Sportspeople from Rotorua
Commonwealth Games competitors for New Zealand
Cyclists at the 2006 Commonwealth Games
21st-century New Zealand people